Ashwani Kumar may refer to:

 Ashwani Kumar (cricketer) (born 2001), Indian cricketer
 Ashwani Kumar (politician) (born 1952), Indian politician
 Ashwani Kumar (police officer) (1950–2020), Indian police officer and governor of Nagaland
 Ashwani Kumar (scientist), Indian bio-technologist